Chen Guoliang (born 2 February 1999) is a Chinese footballer currently playing as a defender for Shenzhen.

Club career
Chen started his career with Shandong Luneng Taishan, spending time in 2014 with the club's affiliate training centre in Brazil. In January 2018, Chen moved to Spain to sign for Estudiantes de Murcia. He spent the beginning of 2020 with Los Garres, but did not feature, before returning to China to sign for Shenzhen in February of the same year.

In April 2022, he was loaned to China League One side Liaoning Shenyang Urban.

Career statistics
.

Notes

References

1999 births
Living people
Footballers from Shandong
Chinese footballers
China youth international footballers
Association football defenders
Tercera División players
China League One players
Shandong Taishan F.C. players
Shenzhen F.C. players
Liaoning Shenyang Urban F.C. players
Chinese expatriate footballers
Chinese expatriate sportspeople in Spain
Expatriate footballers in Spain